Alexis Jordan (born April 7, 1992) is an American former singer and actress from Columbia, South Carolina. Jordan rose to fame as a contestant on the first season of America's Got Talent in 2006 at the age of 14. After being eliminated from the show, she began to upload cover songs to YouTube, which received millions of views. The exposure led Jordan to the attention of Norwegian production team Stargate and American rapper Jay Z, who both went on to sign her to their joint label, StarRoc.

Jordan's debut single, "Happiness", was released in September 2010, and reached number one in the Netherlands and Norway, and also became a top-three hit in Australia and the United Kingdom. Jordan's debut self-titled album was released on February 25, 2011. "Good Girl" was released as Jordan's second single in February 2011. It debuted on the UK Albums Chart at No. 9 and on the Australian Albums Chart at No. 11. Jordan also featured on Sean Paul's single "Got 2 Luv U", which reached number one in Switzerland and Bulgaria.

Life and career

1992–2008: Early life and career beginnings

Jordan was born on April 7, 1992, in Columbia, South Carolina, to a mother of African American, white, Native American descent and a Puerto Rican father. Jordan began writing songs while she was in third grade. At the age of 11, she moved with her parents and three younger siblings Taylor, Malichai and Malcolm to Santa Clarita, California, to pursue a career in the arts. At the age of 12, Jordan served as an opening act for Smokey Robinson at a Stevie Wonder tribute concert.

In 2006, Jordan auditioned for the first season of America's Got Talent. She sang Whitney Houston's "I Have Nothing" at her audition and made it through to the next round, only to be eliminated in the semifinals. Judge Brandy brought her back to compete in the semifinals, after the public didn't gather enough votes for Jordan. After being eliminated from the show, Jordan and her family moved to Atlanta to be closer to the music industry. While there, she began to upload cover songs on YouTube while submitting demos. By 2008, Jordan's YouTube page was racking up millions of views. The exposure led Jordan to the attention of production team Stargate who called her to fly to New York and record a few songs with them. While in the studio, rapper Jay-Z walked in, which ultimately resulted in Jordan becoming the first artist signed to the new, Sony Music-affiliated label, StarRoc/Roc Nation – a joint venture between Stargate and Jay-Z's Roc Nation label.

2010–12: Record deal and Alexis Jordan

Her self-titled debut album was released on February 25, 2011. The album was recorded from January 1, 2007, to October 15, 2010, in which Jordan worked with StarGate, Sandy Vee, Nightwatch and Espionage. The album debuted at number twenty-eight in Ireland on March 4, 2011. In the United Kingdom, the album debuted at number nine on March 6, 2011. The album also debuted at number eleven in Australia. On April 30, 2011, the album debuted at number 80 on the Dutch Album Chart. In its 13th week the album shot from 72 to 23, reaching its peak of 21 two weeks later.
Jordan's single "Happiness" was released in September 2010. In the United States, the song reached No. 1 on the Hot Dance Club Songs, becoming Jordan's first No. 1 single on that chart. It also reached No. 1 in Norway and the Netherlands (where it stayed for 10 weeks), and peaked at No. 3 in Australia and the United Kingdom. In Australia, "Happiness" was certified triple platinum by the Australian Recording Industry Association (ARIA), for shipments of 210,000 copies. "Good Girl" was released as Jordan's second single in February 2011. The song debuted at No. 6 on the UK Singles Chart, giving Jordan her second top-10 hit in the United Kingdom. It also reached No. 15 in Ireland and became her second chart-topper on the Billboard Hot Dance Club Songs chart in April.  "Hush Hush" was released as the album's third single on May 8, 2011.

On April 12, 2012 Alexis embarked on her first headline tour in the United Kingdom. Jordan performed in three cities – London (Scala) on Thursday June 30, Birmingham HMV (Institute) on Saturday July 2 and Manchester (Club Academy) on Sunday July 3. Tickets went on sale on Friday April 15. In June and July 2011 Jordan also supported British boy band JLS on their eight-day UK tour. She also appeared at T4 on the Beach in the UK and performed "Hush Hush" and "Good Girl". Jordan featured on Sean Paul's single "Got 2 Luv U", which reached number one in Switzerland, Netherlands, Norway, Bulgaria, Romania, France,  United States Billboard (in the Latin Raps & Pop Songs) and Venezuela. Jordan also made a cameo appearance in the film Honey 2. In June 2012, Jordan appeared at Birmingham Pride, performing "Good Girl", "Got 2 Luv U", "Shout Shout" and "Hush Hush" On November 25, 2012, she appeared as musical guest on X Factor (Romania).

2012–14: Second studio album
In October 2011, she confirmed via Twitter that she was working on her second studio album. In November 2011, Jordan went to a recording studio in New York where she recorded with Stargate, she stated that the album is nearly completed. In the same YouTube video uploaded by Jordan, she was asked what she was doing and she replied "Writing about different things 'cause I'm like all messed up cause I'm talking about girl power, then I'm talking about myself and how people don't really know me that well so they gonna get to know me in this song."

On January 15, 2013, a new song titled "Acid Rain" leaked online. It was intended to serve as the lead cut from her second album. "Acid Rain" samples Bingo Players‘ song “Rattle,” and is written by Sia and produced by Stargate. However it served only as a buzz single, as it was leaked in early 2013 and was never released on worldwide radios. On December 28, 2013 Jordan released a new message on her Facebook page in which she confirms that the official lead single from her then upcoming second studio album would be titled "Gone" and it would be released on March 1, 2014. The official video was shot in late 2013. Its official music video was premiered on February 28, 2014. Jordan was dropped by Jay-Z's Roc Nation label after the single failed to chart.

Personal life

In 2014 Jordan married Luke Broadlick. In 2016, she gave birth to their daughter, Anora. In 2017, she gave birth to their first son, Lincoln. In 2019, she gave birth to their second son, Abel.

Artistry

Music and influences
Jordan's self-titled debut album contained dance-pop, pop and R&B music, in an interview Jordan described the album's musical style saying "I don’t want to be kept in a box. I’m that pop artist, but I can switch it up and turn to R&B/soul and do lots of ballads and the hip-hop swag. It’s very versatile". Alexis described her album's genre as being "universal" saying in an interview "It's going to be very universal. It's not just a pop dance record. It has a little reggae, a little hip-hop swag, so it's going to be everything."

Jordan cites singers Christina Aguilera, Whitney Houston, Mariah Carey and Beyoncé as influences. Jordan also cites Michael Jackson as an influence, calling him "a big inspiration", and also is inspired by Billie Holiday, saying "I like Billie Holiday’s sound".

Discography

Studio albums
 Alexis Jordan (2011)

Filmography

Television

Awards and nominations

References

External links

 
 

1992 births
Living people
African-American actresses
American people of Puerto Rican descent
American people who self-identify as being of Native American descent
Actresses from Columbia, South Carolina
Actresses from Santa Clarita, California
A
African-American women singers
American child actresses
American child singers
American dance musicians
American film actresses
American television actresses
America's Got Talent contestants
Child pop musicians
Hispanic and Latino American actresses
21st-century American actresses
21st-century American singers
American YouTubers
Musicians from Columbia, South Carolina
21st-century American women singers
Music YouTubers